The 2022 Northern European Gymnastics Championships was an artistic gymnastics competition held in Jyväskylä, Finland. The event was held between 19 November and 20 November 2022.

Medalists

References 

Northern European Gymnastics Championships
Northern European Gymnastics Championships
Northern European Gymnastics Championships
Northern European Gymnastics Championships